String Quartet No. 30 may refer to:

 String Quartet No. 30 (Haydn) by Joseph Haydn
 String Quartet No. 30 (Spohr) by Louis Spohr